The mixed doubles tournament at the 1984 French Open was held from 26 May until 10 June 1984 on the outdoor clay courts at the Stade Roland Garros in Paris, France. Dick Stockton and Anne Smith won the title, defeating Laurie Warder and Anne Minter in the final.

Seeds

Draw

Finals

Top half

Section 1

Section 2

Bottom half

Section 3

Section 4

External links
1984 French Open – Doubles draws and results at the International Tennis Federation

Mixed Doubles
French Open by year – Mixed doubles